Kanae Yamamoto may refer to:

 Kanae Yamamoto (artist) (1882–1946), Japanese artist
 Kanae Yamamoto (politician) (born 1971), Japanese politician